Valerie Benaim (born 30 August 1969) is a Moroccan-born French journalist, columnist, writer, TV Presenter and radio host.

Personal life
She was born in Casablanca, Morocco.

In 2012, she joined the team of the TV show Touche pas à mon poste! with Cyril Hanouna.

In 2015, Valerie Benaim was elected 2nd Favourite columnist with 37% of the way in a TV poll, behind Anne-Élisabeth Lemoine.

In 2016, she became the godmother of the association "Juste Humain".

Television

Radio

Bibliography

Theater

References

External links

1969 births
Living people
People from Casablanca
French television journalists
French television presenters
French women television presenters
French radio presenters
French women radio presenters
French radio journalists
French women journalists
French columnists
French women columnists
Moroccan women columnists
Moroccan television journalists
Moroccan women television journalists
Moroccan television presenters
Moroccan women television presenters
Moroccan radio presenters
Moroccan women radio presenters
Moroccan women radio journalists
Moroccan radio journalists
Moroccan columnists
French people of Moroccan descent
20th-century Moroccan Jews